George Johnson (6 January 1907 – February 1989) was an English footballer who played as a full back in the Football League for Wigan Borough and Darlington.

Johnson made his Football League debut on 3 October 1925, as Wigan Borough lost 3–1 away to Southport. He played twice more in the Third Division North, both defeats, before leaving the club and returning to his native north-east of England. He spent time with Walker Celtic before signing for Darlington, for whom he played twice in the Second Division. In the 1927 close season, he signed for Chelsea. He was retained for at least two more seasons, but retired at end of 1929/30 season. but never played first-team football for the club. He went on to play non-league football for Northfleet, and worked as a bus driver in London.

References

1907 births
1989 deaths
Place of birth missing
English footballers
Association football fullbacks
Wigan Borough F.C. players
Walker Celtic F.C. players
Darlington F.C. players
Chelsea F.C. players
Northfleet United F.C. players
English Football League players
Place of death missing